William John Legh, 1st Baron Newton,  (19 December 1828 – 15 December 1898), was a British Conservative politician and Volunteer officer.

Legh was the son of William Legh. He sat as a Member of Parliament for Lancashire South from 1859 to 1865 and for Cheshire East from 1868 to 1885. On 27 August 1892 he was raised to the peerage as Baron Newton, of Newton-in-Makerfield in the County Palatine of Lancaster.

On 5 May 1866 he was commissioned as Lieutenant-Colonel to command the 4th Administrative Battalion, Cheshire Rifle Volunteer Corps, and after his period of command he was appointed Honorary Colonel of the part-time battalion on 25 January 1873.

Lord Newton married Emily Jane, daughter of the Venerable Charles Nourse Wodehouse, Archdeacon of Norwich, in 1856. He died in December 1898, aged 69, and was succeeded in the barony by his eldest son Thomas, who became a government minister. His great-grandson Peter Legh, 4th Baron Newton, was also a Conservative politician and government minister. Lady Newton died in 1901.

Arms

Notes

References
Kidd, Charles, Williamson, David (editors). Debrett's Peerage and Baronetage (1990 edition). New York: St Martin's Press, 1990,

External links 

1828 births
1898 deaths
Barons in the Peerage of the United Kingdom
Deputy Lieutenants of Cheshire
Deputy Lieutenants of Lancashire
Members of the Parliament of the United Kingdom for English constituencies
UK MPs 1859–1865
UK MPs 1868–1874
UK MPs 1874–1880
UK MPs 1880–1885
UK MPs who were granted peerages
Place of birth missing
Peers of the United Kingdom created by Queen Victoria